Felix Kwieton (16 November 1877 – 19 December 1958) was an Austrian long-distance runner. He competed at the 1906 Intercalated Games and 1912 Summer Olympics.

References

1877 births
1958 deaths
Athletes (track and field) at the 1906 Intercalated Games
Athletes (track and field) at the 1912 Summer Olympics
Austrian male long-distance runners
Austrian male marathon runners
Olympic athletes of Austria
Athletes from Vienna